Ewan Thompson (born 29 March 1977) is a former Australian rules footballer who played for Richmond in the Australian Football League (AFL) in 1997. He was recruited from the Northern Knights in the TAC Cup with the 59th selection in the 1995 AFL Draft.

References

External links

1977 births
Living people
VFL/AFL players born outside Australia
Richmond Football Club players
Northern Knights players
Australian rules footballers from Victoria (Australia)
Scottish emigrants to Australia